Simeon II or Symeon II was the Greek Orthodox Patriarch of Jerusalem from the 1080s to 1099.

Patriarch 

Simeon was appointed the Greek Orthodox Patriarch of Jerusalem in the 1080s. Pope Urban II addressed a letter to him, urging him to acknowledge papal primacy to achieve the union of the Roman Catholic and Greek Orthodox churches. The Ecumenical Patriarch of Constantinople, Nicholas III of Constantinople, warned Simeon against the accepting the Pope's offer, reminding him to the Orthodox views about Eucharist, primacy and the Nicene Creed. Simeon wrote a commentary about the use of unleavened bread in the Eucharist in the Roman Catholic Church in defence of the Orthodox practise. After the Artuqids forced him into exile, he settled in Cyprus.

References

Sources 

 
 
 

11th-century Greek Orthodox Patriarchs of Jerusalem